The Ogren Plant Allergy Scale (OPALS) is an allergy rating system for plants that measures the potential of a plant to cause allergic reactions in humans.

Scale system 
The OPALS allergy scale was first published in Allergy-Free Gardening, by Thomas Leo Ogren, in 2000. It covers over 3,000 common trees, shrubs, flowers, and grasses. The allergy scale was updated and extended in 2015 in The Allergy-Fighting Garden.

The Ogren Plant Allergy Scale takes into account pollen allergies, contact allergies, and odor allergies, with higher weighting given to pollen allergies that are caused by inhaling pollen into the lungs. Additionally, plants that cause contact allergies (such as rashes or itching), or that are highly poisonous when ingested even though their pollen does not cause respiratory allergies, are never given low ratings.

Low allergy ratings are considered to be 1 through 3 on the allergy scale. Mid-range ratings are 4 through 6, and high ratings are 7 through 10. Plants with ratings of 9 or 10 have an extremely high potential to cause allergic reactions.

Application
 Canada: The OPALS allergy scale was used in the Canadian Urban Allergy Audit, which was conducted in 2012.

 United Kingdom: OPALS allergy scale labels for plants sold at nurseries have recently become available for use within the United Kingdom.

 United States: OPALS has been adopted for use by the American Lung Association and the U.S. Department of Agriculture Urban and Community Forest Service. More recently, the California Public Health Department has endorsed the use of this allergy scale in city landscape planning to reduce asthma.

References

External links
 

Allergology
Medical scales